Ring Around the Moon is a 1936 American drama film directed by Charles Lamont and starring Donald Cook, Erin O'Brien-Moore and Ann Doran.

Cast
 Donald Cook as Ross Graham  
 Erin O'Brien-Moore as Gloria Endicott  
 Ann Doran as Kay Duncan  
 Alan Edwards as Pete Mattland  
 Douglas Fowley as Ted Curlew  
 John Qualen as Bill Harvey  
 Barbara Bedford as Carol Anderson 
 Dot Farley as Bella  
 Mildred Gover as Emma  
 John Miltern as Mr. Endicott  
 Eddie Phillips as Charlie  
 Vera Steadman as Mayme  
 Carl Stockdale as Brenton  
 Richard Tucker as Baxter

References

Bibliography
 Goble, Alan. The Complete Index to Literary Sources in Film. Walter de Gruyter, 1999.

External links
 

1936 films
1936 drama films
American drama films
Films directed by Charles Lamont
Chesterfield Pictures films
American black-and-white films
1930s English-language films
1930s American films